This is a list of the tallest oil platforms over  in height. The current highest oil platform is the Petronius platform operated by Chevron Corporation and Marathon Oil in the Gulf of Mexico, 210 km southeast of New Orleans, United States.

References 

Oil platforms
Tallest